The Frescoes in the Cartuja de Aula Dei (1774) are a cycle of frescoes or mural paintings on the Life of the Virgin by Francisco de Goya, realised in secco (i.e., painted in oils directly onto the wall surface), in the church of the Charterhouse of Aula Dei near Peñaflor de Gállego on the outskirts of Zaragoza, Aragon, Spain.

History
After his return from a learning trip to Italy, Goya received various commissions for frescoes. One was for the Basílica del Pilar in Zaragoza, where he painted the Adoration of the Name of God. Another, for the church of the Charterhouse of Aula Dei, where his brother-in-law Manuel Bayeu was a monk, was a series on the Life of the Virgin up to the Presentation of Jesus at the Temple, which he completed in 1774.

In this work Goya showed his mastery of large-scale mural painting, handling scenes each measuring between five and ten metres in length and one to three metres in height, and between them covering the entire area of the interior walls of the Carthusian church.

Of the original eleven paintings there now remain only seven, as a result of damage consequent upon the abandonment of the monastery during the Desamortizacion, or dispossession of the church, by Juan Álvarez Mendizábal in 1835-37. The other four had to be re-painted, by the brothers Paul and Amedée Buffet in 1903, after the charterhouse was reacquired by the Carthusian Order for the accommodation of two exiled French Carthusian communities in 1901. The seven surviving pictures were also damaged by the years of neglect and exposure, and were restored in 1978-79.

Description
Goya began work on the frescoes in 1773 at the request of Brother Félix Salcedo and Brother José Lalana. The series consists of scenes from the life of the Virgin arranged in a frieze round the walls of the monastic church. The series begins with Joachim and Anne (Mary's parents) located above the main doors, and thereafter alternate between scenes from the Gospels and from the Epistles. Thus to the right the next picture is of the Birth of the Virgin, while to the left is the Marriage of the Virgin. There follow the Visitation of Mary to her cousin Elizabeth, the Circumcision, the Adoration of the Magi and finally, of what remains from Goya's original works, the Presentation of Jesus at the Temple.

See also
List of works by Francisco Goya

Notes and references

Further reading 
Bozal, Valeriano, 2005: Francisco Goya, vida y obra (vol. 1), pp. 31-34. Madrid. 
Glendinning, Nigel, 1993: Francisco de Goya: Cuadernos de Historia 16 ("El arte y sus creadores", No. 30), pp. 30-32. D.L. 34276-1993

External links 
Universidad de Zaragoza: catalogue of Goya's works 
Aragonesasi: Goya en La Cartuja de Aula Dei 
Universidad de Zaragoza InfoGoya: Goya en la Cartuja de Aula Dei 
GoyaRestauracion.com: Website of the restoration of the frescoes 1978-79 

Paintings by Francisco Goya
1770s paintings
1770s in Spain
Cartuja de Aula Dei
History of Zaragoza
Aragonese culture
Paintings of the Virgin Mary
Tourist attractions in Zaragoza
Paintings in Zaragoza